Middle East Bank Kenya is a commercial bank in Kenya. It is licensed by the Central Bank of Kenya, the central bank and national banking regulator.

The bank is a small retail bank, that focuses on meeting the needs of large corporations and high-net-worth individuals. , the bank was ranked number 41, by assets, out of a total of 43 commercial banks in Kenya. , the bank's total assets were valued at about US$100 million (KES:11.02 billion), with shareholders' equity of approximately US$13 million (KES:1.124 billion).

History
Middle East Bank Kenya Ltd started operations in Kenya in August 1981, after receiving a banking license from the Central Bank of Kenya, the national banking regulator. The initial shareholders in the bank were the Al-Futtaim Group, affiliated with the Middle East Bank Group of United Arab Emirates. In 1991, the Al-Futtaim Group divested from the bank, leaving shareholding in Kenyan hands.

In 1995, Banque Belgolaise, a Belgian financial institution acquired 25% shareholding in Middle East Bank Kenya, becoming the single largest shareholder. As a result of multiple bank mergers and acquisitions, that 25% shareholding subsequently came to be owned by BNP Paribas Fortis. 75% shareholding remains in private Kenyan hands.

Ownership
The shares of stock of Middle East Bank Kenya are privately held. The largest single shareholder, with 25% shareholding, is BNP Paribas Fortis, a Belgian financial services provider that is a subsidiary of BNP Paribas, a French banking conglomerate that is the largest banking group in the world. Shareholding in Meddle East Bank is depicted in the table below:

Branch network
, the bank maintains its headquarters in Nairobi, Kenya's capital and largest city. It has three branches; two in Nairobi and another in Mombasa, Kenya's second-largest city.
 Main Branch –  Mebank Tower, Milimani Road, Nairobi
 Industrial Area Branch – Butere Road, Off Dar es Salaam Road, Nairobi
 Mombasa Branch – Nkrumah Road, Mombasa
 Eldoret Branch –Enterprise Road , [Nairobi]

See also
 List of banks in Kenya
 Central Bank of Kenya
 Economy of Kenya

References

External links
Website of Central Bank of Kenya
Addresses of Major Kenyan Commercial Banks

Banks of Kenya
Companies based in Nairobi
Banks established in 1981
Kenyan companies established in 1981